John Speraw (born October 18, 1971) is an American volleyball coach. He is the head coach of the men's volleyball team at United States national team and UCLA. He was the former coach of UC Irvine volleyball program where he led the team to three national titles in six years. Speraw graduated from UCLA in 1995 with a B.S. degree in micro-biology and molecular genetics.

Player
Speraw played on the UCLA Bruins men's volleyball team. He was a middle blocker and helped the Bruins win two NCAA National Championships. He was a member of the California Epsilon chapter of Phi Kappa Psi while at UCLA.

Coaching
As the UC Irvine head coach, he guided the Anteaters to three national titles in six years, the latest in 2012, defeating Southern California 3-0 (25-22, 34-32, 26-24). Speraw also led the Anteaters to the Final Four in 2006.

At the 2008 Beijing Olympics, Speraw was an assistant coach to the USA team which won the Gold Medal.

Prior to becoming the coach at UC Irvine, he was an assistant coach at UCLA.  As of the year 2012, John Speraw has returned to UCLA as the new Men's Volleyball head coach.

John was the head coach of the 2016 & 2020 USA men's Olympic volleyball team.

Honors and awards
 Only individual in men's volleyball history to win an NCAA Championship as a head coach, assistant coach and player
 NCAA Champion, UC Irvine Head Coach 2007, 2009, and 2012
 NCAA Champion, UCLA Assistant Coach 1996, 1998, and 2000
 NCAA Champion, UCLA Player 1993 and 1995
 MPSF Coach of the Year, 2006
 U.S. National Indoor Team Head Coach, Bronze Medal, 2016 Rio de Janeiro Olympics
 U.S. National Indoor Team Assistant Coach, Gold Medal, 2008 Beijing Olympics
 U.S. National Indoor Team Assistant Coach, 2012 London Olympics

See also
United States men's national volleyball team

References

External links
 John Speraw's official bio at USA Volleyball
 Coach Speraw's Official Website
John Speraw BIO UCLA at UCLA Athletics

1971 births
American volleyball coaches
UC Irvine Anteaters men's volleyball coaches
Living people
American men's volleyball players
Sportspeople from Los Angeles
UCLA Bruins men's volleyball players
UCLA Bruins men's volleyball coaches
People from Arcadia, California
American Olympic coaches